Strangers' church was a term used by English-speaking people for independent Protestant churches established in foreign lands or by foreigners in England  during the Reformation. (The spelling stranger church is also found in texts of the period and modern scholarly works.)

English churches on the European continent

Many English churches sprang up in the Low Countries and Rhineland during the English Reformation. The most famous of these were established by the Marian exiles who fled Catholic persecution under Mary Tudor. Among these was the English Reformed Church, Amsterdam.

The Stranger Churches in England

The first Stranger Church to be set up in England was that led by the Italian reformer, Bernardino Ochino in 1547 (Cranmer's permission coming in January 1548). Although set up for the Italian community in London, it welcomed reformed Protestants of other nationalities as well. Cranmer made it quite clear that this was an example of how he wanted the reformation in England to proceed by forcing the traditionalist Bishop Edmund Bonner to attend Ochino's inaugural sermon.

To the dismay of bishop of London Nicholas Ridley, the fully independent Stranger Churches were founded in his see in 1550 with the help of Protestant aristocrats such as William Cecil and Katherine Brandon, Duchess of Suffolk. On 24 July 1550 the Dutch Stranger Church of London received a royal charter and was incorporated by letters patent. The congregation received a grant of the Austin or Augustinian Friars Church  which remains the site of the city's Dutch Protestant Church, the church itself having been destroyed in World War II. Upon incorporation, the church was renamed the "Temple of the Lord Jesus" and given four pastors: two for the Dutch church, and two for the French/Walloon church meeting in St. Anthony's Chapel.

Cranmer's main purposes in giving official sanction to the Churches seem to have been two-fold. Firstly, they provided a glimpse of how a reformed Protestant Church might work in England, within the episcopal system which many of the "hotter" reformers wished to abolish. Secondly, and perhaps more importantly, they helped Cranmer and his allies in the suppression of heretical strains of religion, such as the non-Trinitarian George van Parris, who was burned in 1551 with the assistance of John a Lasco (known in Poland as Jan Łaski).

Members of London's Dutch Stranger Church 
 John a Lasco, first superintendent of the church
 Steven Mierdman, printer (pseud. Niclaes  van Oldenborch), joined the church in 1550
 Justus Velsius, dissident, joined the church in 1563 until expelled from the kingdom

See also 

Marian exiles
English Reformed Church, Amsterdam
Dutch Church, Austin Friars

Further reading 
  
 MacCulloch, Diarmaid, Thomas Cranmer (London, 1996)
 MacCulloch, Diarmaid, Tudor Church Militant: Edward VI and the Protestant Reformation (London, 1999)
  
 Spicer, Andrew (2012), "'A Place of Refuge and Sanctuary of a Holy Temple': Exile Communities and the Stranger Churches." In: Nigel Goose and Lien Luu (eds.), Immigrants in Tudor and Early Stuart England, Brighton: Sussex Academic Press, pp. 91–109.
 Spicer, Andrew, "The Consistory Records of Reformed Congregations and the Exile Churches." In: Proceedings of the Huguenot Society, 28 (2007), pp. 640–663.

References 

1547 establishments in England
16th-century Protestant churches
Types of church buildings
Strangers